The Kyiv metropolitan area is an unofficially designated urban agglomeration within the outer boundary of Kyiv Oblast in Ukraine. It consists of the country's capital city of Kyiv (an enclave within the oblast), its satellite settlements and nearest rural areas closely bound to the city by employment and commerce. According to different sources, it is ranked among 20 largest metropolitan areas in Europe.

Area and population

 Total population: censuses and estimates numbers vary from 3.375.000  (138 world rank) to 3,648,900 (some other sources bring 4,130,000 - 5,206,000);
 Kyiv City proper population:
 official:  as of July 2013;
  as of the 2001 Ukrainian census
 at least 3.5 million, according to the 2007 estimates based on the amount of bakery products sold in the city (thus including temporary visitors and commuters)
 Suburban population: 
 Total area: 13,534 km².
 Population density: 268,4 people/km².

Economy and infrastructure

Gross Regional Product

In 2020, Kiev metropolitan area had a Gross regional product of ₴1.257 trillion (€32 billion) of which ₴1.015 trillion was Kyiv city and ₴242 billion Kyiv Oblast.

Transport

The area has a highly developed railway and road infrastructure, being linked to Kyiv through the suburban railways, buses and minibuses.

Kyiv metropolitan area is served by two international passenger airports: Boryspil Airport and Kyiv (Zhuliany) Airport; there are also the Gostomel cargo airport and additional three operating airfields facilitating airplane manufacturing and general aviation.

Environment
According to the UN 2011 evaluation, there were no risks of natural disasters in the Kyiv metropolitan area

References

External links
 Алфьоров М.А. Урбанізаційні процеси в Україні в 1945-1991 рр: Монографія/ М.А.Алфьоров – Донецьк: Донецьке відділення НТШ ім. Шевченка, ТОВ «Східний видавничий дім» 2012. – 552 с. 

 
Metropoliten area
Geography of Kyiv Oblast
Metropolitan areas of Ukraine
Economy of Kyiv
Economy of Kyiv Oblast